The table below lists the judgments of the Constitutional Court of South Africa delivered in 2013.

The members of the court at the start of 2013 were Chief Justice Mogoeng Mogoeng, Deputy Chief Justice Dikgang Moseneke, and judges Edwin Cameron, Johan Froneman, Chris Jafta, Sisi Khampepe, Bess Nkabinde, Thembile Skweyiya, Johann van der Westhuizen, Zak Yacoob and Raymond Zondo. Justice Yacoob retired at the end of January and was replaced by the appointment of Mbuyiseli Madlanga in April.

References

 

2013
Constitutional Court